Shatalov (masculine) or Shatalova (feminine) is a Russian surname. Notable people with the surname include:

Vladimir Shatalov (1927–2021), Soviet Kazakhstani cosmonaut
Yuri Shatalov (1945–2018), Soviet Russian ice hockey player
Yuriy Shatalov (born 1963), Ukrainian-Russian footballer and manager

See also
Shatalov (crater), lunar impact crater

Russian-language surnames